Photo Raster is advanced online photo editor. Photo Raster contains integrated tools for digital painting, layer editing, non-destructive editing, photo retouching, image adjustments and filters.

The application is written in JavaScript and uses various HTML5 elements for its function, like WebGL for GPU acceleration.

Features 

 Paint tools (brush, pencil, eraser, smudge, blur, sharpen, dodge, burn, contrast, saturation)
 Layer based editing (Blending modes, Opacity control, Merging, Transformation)
 Layer masks (up to four mask per layer, mask tools)
 Image filters (blur, sharpen, find edges, noise, denoise, distort, pixelize, render textures)
 Image adjustments (brightness, contrast, exposure, hue/saturation/lightness, color balance, vibrance, desaturate, threshold)
 Selection tools (rectangular/elliptical/polygonal selections, selection operations)
 Image transformations (resize, rotate, flip, crop)

Version history

See also 
Comparison of raster graphics editors

References

External links 
 
Articles about Photo Raster:
Photo Raster: An Advanced Online Photo Editor, appstorm.net, 23 October 2012
(Spanish) Photo Raster: Edición de imágenes Online, Loquenecesita.com, 9 September 2012
(Spanish) Photo Raster programa online para edición de imágenes, Geekets.com, 10 September 2012
(Portuguese) Raster Photo 0.9.2 Beta, baixaki.com.br, 11 September 2012
(Italian) Photo Raster: programma gratuito per modificare foto online, Maestroalberto.it, 10 September 2012
(Persian) Photo Raster: ویرایشگر قدرتمند عکس به صورت آنلاین, bekridea.com, 20 September 2012

Raster graphics editors